Autodrome Chaudière is a quarter mile, high banked, asphalt short track located in Vallée-Jonction, Quebec, Canada, about 65 kilometres south of Quebec City.

The circuit opened in 1992 as a dirt track; in 2005, the track underwent resurfacing to convert it into an asphalt track. Notable series which have competed at Autodrome Chaudiere include the ACT Castrol Series, PASS North Series, ISMA Racing Series and Sportsman Quebec. The track has also hosted a NASCAR Pinty's Series race every year since June 2014 (except for 2020 and 2021). The track record, 10.77 seconds, was established on 22 June 2013 by American driver Ben Seitz from the ISMA Racing Series.

References

External links

Autodrome Chaudière race results at Racing-Reference
Autodrome Chaudière on thrirdturn.com

Paved oval racing venues in Quebec
Motorsport venues in Canada
NASCAR tracks